Ani Karapetyan (born 30 May 2001) is an Armenian footballer who plays as a defender for FC Alashkert and the Armenia women's national team.

International career
Karapetyan capped for Armenia at senior level in a 0–1 friendly loss to Lithuania on 4 March 2020.

See also
List of Armenia women's international footballers

References

2001 births
Living people
Women's association football defenders
Armenian women's footballers
Armenia women's international footballers
FC Alashkert players